Michaël Barré (born August 31, 1974, in Carentan) is a French professional football player.

He played on the professional level in Ligue 2 for SM Caen.

1974 births
Living people
People from Carentan
French footballers
Ligue 2 players
Stade Malherbe Caen players
AS Cherbourg Football players
FC Saint-Lô Manche players
Association football defenders
Sportspeople from Manche
Footballers from Normandy